Ladislao Brazionis (born 23 June 1929) was a Uruguayan footballer. He played in five matches for the Uruguay national football team in 1956. He was also part of Uruguay's squad for the 1956 South American Championship.

References

External links
 
 

1929 births
Possibly living people
Uruguayan footballers
Uruguay international footballers
Place of birth missing (living people)
Association football defenders
Rampla Juniors players